WG may refer to:

In arts and entertainment
 W&G Records, an Australian recording company
 Will & Grace, a television series
 Wonder Girls, a South Korean girl group

Businesses
 W. G. Bagnall, a locomotive manufacturer in Stafford, England
 Sunwing Airlines (IATA code WG)
 Westminster Group, an international security group listed on London Stock Exchange
 Wargaming.net (or just Wargaming), a video game designer

People
 W. G. Grace, English cricketer
 W. G. Sebald (1944–2001), a German writer
 W. G. Snuffy Walden (born 1950), a musician and composer
 Whoopi Goldberg (born 1955), American actor, comedian and moderator of The View (2007–present)

Places
 Grenada (geocode WG)
 Wood Green, an area in North London

In science and technology
 Wegener's granulomatosis, now known as granulomatosis with polyangiitis, is an inflammatory disease that affects blood vessels and organs
 Wingless (Wg) A Drosophila gene originally associated with winglessness
 In. wg., abbreviation for inches of water gauge, a unit of pressure

Other uses
 Wade–Giles (W–G), a romanization system for the Chinese language
 Where's George?, a currency tracking website
 Working group, an ad hoc group of subject-matter experts
 World Games, a recurrent multi-sport event that complements the Olympics
 WG, alternative name for the Welsh Guards
The Welsh Government

See also

 
 TWG (disambiguation)